Sam Ojuri (born September 22, 1990) is an American professional Canadian football running back who is a free agent. He graduated from Barrington High School, and played college football for the North Dakota State University.

College career
Ojuri played for the North Dakota State Bison from 2011 to 2013. He recorded career 616 carries for 3,594 yards and 33 touchdowns while adding 210 receiving yards and one receiving touchdown. He rushed for more than 1,000 yards in all three seasons. The Bison won the NCAA Division I FCS national championship in 2011, 2012, 2013 and 2014.

Professional career

Hamilton Tiger-Cats
Ojuri signed with the Tiger-Cats on July 14, 2014, after going undrafted in the 2014 NFL Draft.

BC Lions
Ojuri signed with the BC Lions on February 5, 2016. He was released by the team on May 5, 2016.

References

External links 
Hamilton Tiger-Cats bio

1990 births
Living people
People from Barrington, Illinois
Players of American football from Illinois
American football running backs
American players of Canadian football
Canadian football running backs
North Dakota State Bison football players
Hamilton Tiger-Cats players
Saskatchewan Roughriders players
Sportspeople from Cook County, Illinois
BC Lions players